Vasily Sergeevich Nemchinov ( (2 January 1894 – 5 November 1964) was a Soviet economist and mathematician. Nemchinov is credited with introducing mathematical methods into Soviet economics, thus creating a scientific basis for central planning.

Biography

Nemchinov was born in Grabovo, a village about 20 km north of Penza in what was then Penzenskaya Guberniya of Imperial Russia. He attended secondary school in Chelyabinsk until 1913. He then studied at the economics department of the Moscow Institute of Commerce. After graduation in 1917 he began to work as an economist and statistician for the local government in the Chelyabinsk district.

Works

 "On the Statistical Study of Rural Class Stratification", 1926, Bulleting of Urals Regional Statistical Admin.
 "Experience from the Classification of Peasant Households", Vestnik statistiki.
 The Use of Mathematics in Economics, 3 volumes, 1959-65.
 Methods and Models of Mathematical Economics, 1967-9.
 Selected Works, 1967-9.

Honors
 Stalin Prize, (1946)
 Honorary member of the Royal Statistical Society, (1961)
 Lenin Prize, (1965, posthumously)

External links
 Biography at the Central Economic Mathematical Institute
 Information about his works

1894 births
1964 deaths
People from Penza Oblast
Soviet economists
Soviet mathematicians
Full Members of the USSR Academy of Sciences
Academicians of the VASKhNIL
Academicians of the Byelorussian SSR Academy of Sciences
Stalin Prize winners
Lenin Prize winners